Ján Riapoš (born 28 September 1968) is a Slovak para table tennis player. He is currently ranked world number four in sports class 2 and world number 61 in wheelchair sports category. He was involved in a car accident in 1993 and has sustained a spinal cord injury, he uses a wheelchair all the time.

References

1968 births
Living people
Sportspeople from Bratislava
Paralympic table tennis players of Slovakia
Medalists at the 2004 Summer Paralympics
Medalists at the 2008 Summer Paralympics
Medalists at the 2012 Summer Paralympics
Table tennis players at the 2000 Summer Paralympics
Table tennis players at the 2004 Summer Paralympics
Table tennis players at the 2008 Summer Paralympics
Table tennis players at the 2012 Summer Paralympics
Table tennis players at the 2016 Summer Paralympics
Paralympic gold medalists for Slovakia
Paralympic silver medalists for Slovakia
Paralympic medalists in table tennis
Table tennis players at the 2020 Summer Paralympics
Slovak male table tennis players